Live at the ICA is a live album by Queenadreena, released in September 2005, which includes songs from their first three albums. It was recorded at the Institute of Contemporary Arts in London on 22 March 2005. In April 2006, the Queenadreena Live DVD was released, featuring both the ICA show and a bonus show at the Astoria in London.

Track listing

Personnel
KatieJane Garsidevocals
Crispin Grayguitar
Paul Jacksonbass
Pete Howarddrums

References

Queenadreena albums
2005 live albums
One Little Independent Records live albums